The SEAT 131 is a rebadged Fiat 131, a mid-size family car, produced by the Spanish car manufacturer SEAT from 1975 to the middle of 1984. The SEAT 131 was presented in May 1975 in the Barcelona Motor Show.

With SEAT having formed a partnership with Fiat, the SEAT 131 was a rebadged version of the Fiat 131, which had been presented nine months earlier in Turin. It received a few locally produced engines and other concessions to the Spanish market. The SEAT 131 entered production in early 1975 in Barcelona and up to the end of its production life cycle 412,948 units were produced.

Versions 

Two sedan versions were offered: the SEAT 131 L, featuring rectangular front lamps, 1438 cc OHC engine and four-speed gearbox, and the SEAT 131 E which featured four round headlamps, a 1592 cc DOHC engine, and a five-speed gearbox.

The range grew up in the spring of 1976 with the SEAT 131 5 puertas unofficially known as the SEAT 131 Familiar, which was the estate version offered with both engines. In 1977 the 131 Automatico (Automatic gearbox) was released and the following year a very short production of the SEAT 131 CLX 1800 was offered. Spain was the only place where the estate 131 was built, but in the export these were labelled Fiat 131 Familiare ("Panorama" after a facelift).

In 1978, the SEAT 131 evolves into the SEAT 131 Mirafiori/Supermirafiori (Panorama for the estate versions), with the same changes as seen on its Italian cousin. The engines remained largely the same, but a 1.8 liter Diesel Perkins 4.108 engine was available in 1979. In 1981, the Diesel version was developed with a new Sofim engine. This 2500 cc engine was much more powerful than the Perkins version (72 hp against only 49 hp) and was one of the most successful taxis in early '80s Spain.

A new CLX edition was launched in 1980. Available only in metallic silver or metallic bronze colours, this 131 CLX had a 1919 cc engine, developing  at 5800 rpm.

In 1982, the SEAT 131 changed again, gathering all the body changes seen on the Fiat 131 series 3. The 131 was now available in CL, Supermirafiori and Diplomatic versions. The Diplomatic was the top of the range, with a 1,995 cc engine and features such as power steering, power windows or air conditioning. The Panorama versions were the cars chosen by the "Cuerpo Nacional de Policia" (Spanish Police force) as patrol cars. In 1984, the whole SEAT 131 range was phased out, without a direct substitute. The brand new Fiat Regata-based SEAT Málaga took its place in 1985.

Curiosities 
The implementation of the diesel engines in the SEAT 131 range took place almost four years after its launch. This would practically exclude the use of the SEAT 131 in the taxi fleet, in spite of its significant performance in both comfort and roominess. In the meantime however, for a great number of Spanish taxi owners and other professionals who were opting for the SEAT 131 as their taxicab of choice, a very common practice was the after-market replacement with a diesel engine of a newly purchased gasoline-powered SEAT 131. Engines that were widely used for this purpose were derived from Perkins, Barreiros, Mercedes-Benz and Sava, but the most widespread option was the 52CV Sava 1,795 cc engine.

Awards 
 Car of the Year 1976, from the Spanish newspaper ABC
 Car of the Year 1979, from the Spanish magazine Motorpress

Technical specifications

References

131
1980s cars
Cars introduced in 1975
Cars discontinued in 1984
Cars of Spain
Station wagons